The Akron RubberDucks are a Minor League Baseball team based in Akron, Ohio. The team, which plays in the Eastern League, is the Double-A affiliate of the Cleveland Guardians. They play in Canal Park, located in downtown Akron, which seats 7,630 fans. The nickname "RubberDucks" refers to Akron's history in the rubber industry, in particular as the birthplace of tire and rubber companies such as Goodyear, Firestone, B.F. Goodrich and General Tire.

History
The franchise began as the Binghamton Triplets, a charter member of the New York–Penn League in 1923. They played in Binghamton, New York at Johnson Field, winning 10 titles over their 46 seasons. After the 1968 season, Boston businessman John Alevizos acquired the franchise and moved it to Gill Stadium, in Manchester, Massachusetts, to become the Manchester Yankees. After 3 seasons in Manchester, the franchise then relocated to West Haven, Connecticut, under new ownership, and became the West Haven Yankees playing at Quigley Stadium. While in West Haven, the franchise won 4 Eastern League titles in their 8 seasons. After the 1979 season, the franchise then moved to Lynn, Massachusetts to become the Lynn Sailors playing at Fraser Field. During the 1983 season they were known as the Lynn Pirates. After the 1983 season, the franchise was moved to Burlington, Vermont, and became the Vermont Reds playing at Centennial Field. As the Reds, the franchise won 3 more Eastern League titles in 5 seasons. In 1988 they were known as the Vermont Mariners. After the 1988 season, the franchise moved to Canton, Ohio and became the Canton-Akron Indians playing at Thurman Munson Memorial Stadium. After the 1996 season, the franchise moved up I-77 to Akron, Ohio and became the Akron Aeros.

Opening Day on April 10, 1997 marked the debut of the Akron Aeros.  With 9,086 fans in attendance, the Aeros and Harrisburg Senators played the first game at Canal Park.  The Aeros went on to finish the season with a record of 51–90.  Despite the last place record, the team drew a Double-A league-leading 473,272 fans to Canal Park that season.

In the 1998 season, the Aeros put together a 30-game "worst-to-first" turnaround; after finishing the prior year 34½ games back, they proceeded to win the Southern Division that season by 8½ games.  However, after losing in the playoffs that year, it would be three more years until the Aeros found their way back to the postseason.

On September 6, 1999, the Aeros set an Eastern League attendance record for three straight seasons and once again led all Double-A teams after 522,459 fans attended Canal Park in 1999.

In 2002, the team posted a 93–48 record, the third-highest win total in the Eastern League in 50 years.  They built on that success and finally won two league championships (their first since moving to Ohio) in 2003 and 2005.  In 2006, the Aeros again posted the best regular-season record in the league, but lost the playoff title to Portland after taking the series to a deciding fifth game.

From 2005 to 2008, the Aeros advanced to the Eastern League Championship Series.  Although the Aeros won the ELCS in 2005, they were defeated in three consecutive trips from 2006 to 2008.

In 2009, the Aeros again advanced to the league championship and defeated the Connecticut Defenders (three games to one) capping a 95-win season and their third title in the last seven years. Jared Head was named the playoff MVP.

In their first three seasons in Canal Park, the Aeros led all of Double-A in attendance, becoming the first team at that level to draw a half-million fans in a single season.

The team was sold by Mike Agganis to Ken Babby in October 2012.

2014–present

On October 29, 2013, the Akron Aeros officially changed their name to the Akron RubberDucks.

The RubberDucks won their first Eastern League Championship under the new name in 2016, sweeping Trenton 3-0. Akron also hosted the 2016 Eastern League All-Star Game at Canal Park.

In conjunction with Major League Baseball's restructuring of Minor League Baseball in 2021, the RubberDucks were placed into the Double-A Northeast. They won the Southwest Division title with a 73–46 record. They qualified for the championship playoffs by possessing the league's best record. Akron defeated the Bowie Baysox, 3–0, in the best-of-five series to win the Double-A Northeast championship. Rouglas Odor was selected as the league Manager of the Year. In 2022, the Double-A Northeast became known as the Eastern League, the name historically used by the regional circuit prior to the 2021 reorganization.

Season-by-season results

1997: 51–90 (5th), manager Jeff Datz
1998: 81–60 (1st), manager Joel Skinner • Lost to Harrisburg 3–1 in first round of playoffs
1999: 69–71 (5th), manager Joel Skinner
2000: 75–68 (3rd), manager Eric Wedge
2001: 68–74 (3rd), manager Chris Bando
2002: 93–48 (1st), manager Brad Komminsk • Lost to Harrisburg 3–2 in first round of playoffs
2003: 88–53 (1st), manager Brad Komminsk • Defeated Altoona 3–1 in first round of playoffs; defeated New Haven 3–0 in ELCS
2004: 63–78 (5th), manager Brad Komminsk
2005: 84–58 (1st), manager Torey Lovullo • Defeated Altoona 3–2 in first round of playoffs; defeated Portland 3–1 in ELCS
2006: 87–55 (1st), manager Tim Bogar • Defeated Altoona 3–2 in first round of playoffs; lost to Portland 3–2 in ELCS
2007: 80–61 (2nd), manager Tim Bogar • Defeated Erie 3–1 in first round of playoffs; lost to Trenton 3–1 in ELCS
2008: 80–62 (2nd), manager Mike Sarbaugh • Defeated Bowie 3–1 in first round of playoffs; lost to Trenton 3–1 in ELCS
2009: 89–53 (1st), manager Mike Sarbaugh • Defeated Reading 3–0 in first round of playoffs; defeated Connecticut 3–1 in ELCS
2010: 71–71 (4th), manager Joel Skinner
2011: 73–69 (4th), manager Chris Tremie
2012: 82-59 (1st), manager Chris Tremie • Defeated Baysox 3–2 in first round of playoffs; defeated Trenton 3–1 in ELCS
2013: 68-73 (5th), manager Edwin Rodriguez
2014: 73-69 (2nd), manager Dave Wallace
2015: 73-69 (4th), manager Dave Wallace
2016: 77-64 (1st), manager Dave Wallace • Defeated Altoona 3–1 in first round of playoffs; defeated Trenton 3-0 in ELCS
2017: 69-71 (3rd), manager Mark Budzinski
2018: 78-62 (2nd), manager Tony Mansolino • Defeated Altoona 3–1 in first round of playoffs; lost to New Hampshire 3–0 in ELCS
2019: 61-79 (5th), manager Rouglas Odor
2020: Season canceled due to COVID-19 pandemic
2021: 73-46 (1st), manager Rouglas Odor • Defeated Bowie 3-0 in Double-A Northeast Championship Series
2022: 79-59 (2nd), manager Rouglas Odor
Note: Place indicates finish in Eastern League's Northern Division from 1980 to 1982; in divisionless Eastern League from 1983 to 1993; in Eastern League's Southern Division from 1994 to 2009; in Eastern League's Western Division from 2010 to 2020; in Double-A Northeast's Southwest Division in 2021.

Notoriety
Over the off-season between the 2010–2011 season, the Aeros received national attention after introducing a number of new promotions as well as menu items at Canal Park. The team was featured in a segment titled "Back in Black" during The Daily Show performed by comedian Lewis Black. In the segment, Black talks about several of the menu items including The "Three Dog Night" consisting of a hot dog in a Bratwurst in a Kielbasa, and "The Nice to Meat You Burger". The food was also covered by CNBC Sports Financial Analyst Darren Rovell.

For the 2016 season, several different promotions were announced, including (but not limited to) Thirsty Thursdays, Star Wars Night on May 4, Shooter McGavin Bobblehead Night, and An action-filled two days for the Eastern League All-Star Game.

Media

Games are broadcast on WHLO AM 640 and the iHeartRadio app. Jim Clark - in his 29th year in 2022 - as well as Marco LaNave call play by play.

Attendance
On August 12, 2017, the RubberDucks reported their highest single-game attendance since rebranding of 8,396 fans.

Roster

See also
 List of Akron Aeros managers

References

External links

 
 Statistics from Baseball-Reference
 Statistics from The Baseball Cube

 
Baseball teams established in 1923
Cleveland Guardians minor league affiliates
Eastern League (1938–present) teams
1997 establishments in Ohio
Professional baseball teams in Ohio
Sports in Akron, Ohio
Double-A Northeast teams